Santa Cruz County, officially the County of Santa Cruz, is a county on the Pacific coast of the U.S. state of California. As of the 2020 census, the population was 270,861. The county seat is Santa Cruz. Santa Cruz County comprises the Santa Cruz–Watsonville, CA Metropolitan Statistical Area, which is also included in the San Jose–San Francisco–Oakland, CA Combined Statistical Area. The county is on the California Central Coast, south of the San Francisco Bay Area region. The county forms the northern coast of the Monterey Bay, with Monterey County forming the southern coast.

History
Santa Cruz County was one of the original counties of California, created in 1850 at the time of statehood. In the original act, the county was given the name of "Branciforte" after the Spanish pueblo founded there in 1797. A major watercourse in the county, Branciforte Creek, still bears this name. Less than two months later, on April 5, 1850, the name was changed to "Santa Cruz" ("Holy Cross").

Mission Santa Cruz, established in 1791 and completed in 1794, was destroyed by the 1857 Fort Tejon earthquake, but a smaller-scale replica was erected in 1931.

Geography
It is the second-smallest county in California by land area and third-smallest by total area. Of California's counties, only San Francisco is smaller by land area.

It can be divided roughly into four regions: the rugged "north coast"; the urban City of Santa Cruz, Soquel, Capitola, and Aptos; mountainous Bonny Doon, San Lorenzo River Valley; and the fertile "south county", including Watsonville and Corralitos. Agriculture is concentrated in the coastal lowlands of the county's northern and southern ends. Most of the north coastal land comprises relatively flat terraces that end at steep cliffs like those shown in the photo below.

Flora and fauna
Santa Cruz County is home to the following threatened or endangered species:

 California clapper rail – endangered (1970)
 California red-legged frog – threatened (1996)
 California tiger salamander – Central California DPS, threatened (2004)
 Coho salmon – Central California Coast ESU is endangered (2005)
 Marbled murrelet – threatened (1992)
 Mount Hermon June beetle – endangered (1997)
 Ohlone tiger beetle – endangered (2001)
 San Francisco garter snake – endangered (1967)
 Santa Cruz long-toed salamander – endangered (1967)
 Santa Cruz tarweed – threatened (2000)
 Smith's blue butterfly – endangered (1976)
 Southern sea otter – threatened (1977)
 Steelhead – Central California Coast DPS is threatened (2011)
 Tidewater goby – endangered (1994)
 Western snowy plover – threatened (1993)
 Yellow-billed cuckoo – threatened (2014)
 Zayante band-winged grasshopper – endangered (1997)

Historically, tule elk (Cervus canadensis nannodes) were native to the coastal grasslands of Santa Cruz County. Elk, sometimes confused with bison, were initially described by Miguel Costansó in his diary of the 1769 Portola Expedition near the mouth of the Pajaro River both on the way north on October 6, and on the way south on November 25. Later, elk were also described by nineteenth century American hunters. They were also described in Santa Cruz County by Jlli tribelet Awaswas Ohlone people, who utilized elk along with pronghorn (Antilocapra americana) and lived on the Jarro Coast (El Jarro Point is north of Davenport, California). Additionally, there is a "Cañada del Ciervo" (ciervo is Spanish for elk) close to the boundary between Rancho de los Corralitos and Rancho San Andrés, near the present-day Larkin Valley Road. This "Elk Valley" place name was given by José Antonio Robles who rode down, roped, and killed elk there in 1831. Lastly, elk remains dating from the Middle and Late Periods in Northern California were found in at least four late Holocene archeological sites in Santa Cruz County, all coastal: SCR-9 (Bonny Doon site) and SCR-20 (Brown site) on the western slope of Ben Lomond Mountain, SCR-93 (Sunflower site) a coastal terrace on the north shore of the San Lorenzo River in Santa Cruz, and SCR-132 (Scott Creek site) 4 miles inland.

Pronghorn antelope (Antilocapra americana) remains were found at the SCR-20 (Brown site) on the western slope of Ben Lomond Mountain dating to about 1500 A.D.

Año Nuevo State Marine Conservation Area, Greyhound Rock State Marine Conservation Area and Natural Bridges State Marine Reserve are marine protected areas off the coast of Santa Cruz County. Like underwater parks, these marine protected areas help conserve ocean wildlife and marine ecosystems.

Adjacent counties

Santa Cruz County borders four other counties: San Mateo to the northwest, Santa Clara to the north and east, Monterey to the south, and San Benito with a small border to the south.

Demographics

2020 census

Note: the US Census treats Hispanic/Latino as an ethnic category. This table excludes Latinos from the racial categories and assigns them to a separate category. Hispanics/Latinos can be of any race.

2011

2010 Census
The county of Santa Cruz has experienced demographic fluctuations in recent history. Between 1990 and 2000, the population increased by 11.3%. This is primarily because of new births, rather than immigration or migration.

The 2010 United States Census reported Santa Cruz County had a population of 262,382. The racial makeup of Santa Cruz County was 190,208 (72.5%) White, 2,766 (1.1%) African American, 2,253 (0.9%) Native American, 11,112 (4.2%) Asian, 349 (0.1%) Pacific Islander, 43,376 (16.5%) from other races, and 12,318 (4.7%) from two or more races. Hispanic or Latino of any race were 84,092 persons (32.0%).

2000

As of the census of 2000, there were 255,602 people, 91,139 households, and 57,144 families residing in the county. The population density was 574 people per square mile (222/km2). There were 98,873 housing units at an average density of 222 per square mile (86/km2).

There were 91,139 households, out of which 31.9% had children under the age of 18 living with them, 48.0% were married couples living together, 10.2% had a female householder with no husband present, and 37.3% were non-families. 25.1% of all households were made up of individuals, and 8.2% had someone living alone who was 65 years of age or older. The average household size was 2.71 and the average family size was 3.25.

In the county, the population was spread out, with 23.8% under the age of 18, 11.9% from 18 to 24, 30.8% from 25 to 44, 23.5% from 45 to 64, and 10.0% who were 65 years of age or older. The median age was 35 years. For every 100 females there were 99.7 males. For every 100 females age 18 and over, there were 97.8 males.

The median income for a household in the county was $53,998, and the median income for a family was $61,941. Males had a median income of $46,291 versus $33,514 for females. The per capita income for the county was $26,396. About 6.7% of families and 11.9% of the population were below the poverty line, including 12.50% of those under age 18 and 6.30% of those age 65 or over.

Santa Cruz County residents tend to be well-educated. 38.3% of residents age 25 and older hold a bachelor's degree at least, significantly higher than the national average of 27.2% and the state average of 29.5%.

Politics
Santa Cruz County was a Republican stronghold for most of the 19th and 20th centuries; from 1860 through 1980 the only Democrats to carry Santa Cruz were Woodrow Wilson in 1916, Franklin D. Roosevelt in 1932 and 1936, Lyndon B. Johnson in 1964, and Jimmy Carter in 1976. However, the opening of UCSC in 1965 caused the county's political landscape to dramatically change.

Today, it is a strongly Democratic county in presidential and congressional elections. The last Republican to carry the county was Ronald Reagan in 1980, and the last Republican to win a majority in the county was Richard Nixon in 1968.

The last Republican to represent a significant portion of Santa Cruz in Congress was Burt L. Talcott, who was defeated in 1976 by Leon Panetta.

In the State Senate, Santa Cruz County is entirely within .

Voter registration

Cities by population and voter registration

Crime

The following table includes the number of incidents reported and the rate per 1,000 persons for each type of offense:

Cities by population and crime rates

Economy
In the 19th century, Santa Cruz's economy was based on milling lumber, making lime cement from limestone, and tanning leather. By the mid 19th century, Santa Cruz was the second largest manufacturing area in the state. As natural resources depleted, tourism became the more important economic sector in the area.

In 1989, Santa Cruz was named as a surplus labor area by the U.S. Department of Labor. A surplus labor area has an unemployment rate 20% higher than national unemployment. As of 2018, Santa Cruz City and Watsonville city are still on this list.

10% of jobs in Santa Cruz County are food producing/processing jobs. These employees make less than an average of $10 an hour.

As of 2003, 21% of residents work outside of Santa Cruz County. This is down form the 28% outside employment rate of 1989.

The agriculture businesses are significant enough to be prominent in local politics, where they influence issues of water, pesticide use, and labor.

There are mandated living wages for Santa Cruz county, and individually in the cities of Watsonville and Santa Cruz. These occurred after The Santa Cruz Living Wage Coalition campaigned to set up ordinances.

The low wage sector of Santa Cruz experiences workplace abuse. Data from 2015 show that in the county, 38% of Agricultural workers have experienced overtime pay violation, 14% of tipped workers reported tips stolen by their employers, and 50% of service sector workers reported violations on receiving breaks. It is California law for employers to make written workplace policies available. However, in a county wide survey, 30% of workers reported that they did not receive an employee handbook.

Service sector laborers have a resource for navigating labor law through the Economic Justice Alliance of Santa Cruz County, a local organization that educates community members on issues of "sustainable wages and working conditions."

Housing market 
In 2002, the National Association of Realtors reported that Santa Cruz was the most unaffordable place to live in the United States. This statement remains true with 2017 data that shows that Santa Cruz is the least affordable county for renters.

In Santa Cruz County, 60% of residents rent and a median monthly rent is $3000.  UCSC's No Place Like Home Project reports that in Santa Cruz County, 2.5 minimum wage jobs would be needed to afford renting a 2 bedroom apartment. UCSC's "No Place Like Home" project identifies four main rental markets: agricultural workers, UCSC students, Silicon Valley tech workers, and short term vacation rentals. Short term rentals in particular have been a rising concern to local politicians, who have proposed parking restrictions to discourage short term renters.

Rent control has been attempted as a policy in Santa Cruz three times between the 1970s and 1980s, but it never passed. National policies since the 1980s have deregulated rental markets, which decreased the rights of tenants and exacerbated frustrations for renters all across the country as well as in Santa Cruz.

27% of surveyed Santa Cruz County renters experience "overcrowding" in their homes, which is described as when there is more than one person per room of a house, which includes all rooms not just bedrooms.

One of the constraints on Santa Cruz's development are environmental protections. The restrictions on land prevent development from responding to housing and employment demands, which is an issue particularly politically relevant in the Watsonville jurisdiction. This conflict between residents wanting to protect the environment and those wanting more housing is also racially divided, as most residents favoring environmental protection are white, while the population on the side of developing housing is more heavily Latino. A 2010–2011 report by a Santa Cruz County grand jury states that Watsonville had no policy for assessing environmental hazards, and would give out land use and building permits without any investigations of the environmental conditions of the land in question.

One of the housing solutions that residents have resorted to is the occupation of accessory dwelling units. Commonly known as "mother-in-law" units, these secondary housing spaces on residential property used to be illegal to build. In 2002, Santa Cruz leaders changed the law and encouraged construction with affordable mortgages. The goal was to contain urban sprawl while still  finding housing alternatives for residents in light of the crisis that was exacerbated by UCSC growth and Silicon Valley encroachment.

Land use 
Debates about land use in Santa Cruz were particularly important after the 1989 Loma Prieta Earthquake, which destroyed the central business district of Santa Cruz and led to the loss of an estimated 2,000 jobs.

Already contentious debates about land were present in the area due to its large tourism industry and the relatively new UCSC campus, but after the quake both private interests and public servants had a stake in how rebuilding would go. This led to a necessary compromise, a public-private partnership that debated the how to rebuild the pacific garden mall space, with considerations of green space, timely implementation, and supporting local business and economy. Many constituents felt left out of this process, and reported that the political elite and economic elite were monopolizing control over the rebuilding movement.

Top employers

According to Santa Cruz County's 2020-21 Comprehensive Annual Financial Report, the top employers in the county are:

Winemaking and wineries

Winemaking—both the growing of the grapes and their vinting—is an important part of the economic and cultural life of Santa Cruz County.
The wines of the David Bruce Winery and Ridge Vineyards were selected for tasting in the Paris Wine Tasting of 1976 (Tabor, p.167-169).

Education

Four-year universities
 University of California, Santa Cruz (public) in Santa Cruz, California
 Bethany University (private, now defunct) in Scotts Valley, California

Two-year college
 Cabrillo College (public) in Aptos, California

K-12 education
School districts include:

Unified:

 Aromas-San Juan Unified School District
 Pajaro Valley Joint Unified School District
 San Lorenzo Valley Unified School District
 Scotts Valley Unified School District

Secondary:
 Los Gatos-Saratoga Joint Union School District
 Santa Cruz City High School District - Covers some areas for grades 6-12 and others for grades 9-12

Elementary:

 Bonny Doon Union Elementary School District
 Happy Valley Elementary School District
 Lakeside Joint Elementary School District
 Live Oak Elementary School District
 Loma Prieta Joint Union Elementary School District
 Mountain Elementary School District
 Pacific Elementary School District
 Santa Cruz City Elementary School District
 Soquel Elementary School District

Transportation

Major highways
  State Route 1
  State Route 9
  State Route 17
  State Route 35
  State Route 129
  State Route 152
  State Route 236

County routes
  County Route G12

Public transportation
Santa Cruz County is served by the Santa Cruz Metropolitan Transit District bus system.

An Amtrak Thruway Motorcoach "Highway 17 Express" bus between Santa Cruz and San Jose is jointly operated by Amtrak, the SCMTD and the Santa Clara Valley Transportation Authority.

Airports
Watsonville Municipal Airport is a public general aviation airport. There are two air carriers based at the airport offering on-demand air charter:
 AirMonterey, LLC (corporate aircraft)
 Specialized Helicopters, LLC (helicopters)

There is a notable private airport, Monterey Bay Academy Airport, which is a former military base.

The nearest airports for scheduled commercial travel include San Jose International Airport, Monterey Regional Airport, San Francisco International Airport, and Oakland International Airport.

Communities

Cities
 Capitola
 Santa Cruz (county seat)
 Scotts Valley
 Watsonville

Census-designated places

 Amesti
 Aptos
 Aptos Hills-Larkin Valley
 Ben Lomond
 Bonny Doon
 Boulder Creek
 Brookdale
 Corralitos
 Davenport
 Day Valley
 Felton
 Freedom
 Interlaken
 La Selva Beach
 Live Oak
 Lompico
 Mount Hermon
 Pajaro Dunes
 Paradise Park
 Pasatiempo
 Pleasure Point
 Rio del Mar
 Seacliff
 Soquel
 Twin Lakes
 Zayante

Unincorporated communities
 Branciforte
 Felton Grove
 Opal Cliffs
 Swanton

Population ranking

The population ranking of the following table is based on the 2010 census of Santa Cruz County.

† county seat

See also

 Hiking trails in Santa Cruz County
 List of museums in the California Central Coast
 List of school districts in Santa Cruz County, California
 National Register of Historic Places listings in Santa Cruz County, California

Sources
 Taber, George M.  Judgment of Paris: California vs. France and the historic 1976 Paris Tasting that Revolutionized Wine. NY: Scribner, 2005.

Notes

References

External links

 
 Santa Cruz Wiki – The People's Guide to Santa Cruz, California
 
 Historical resources for Santa Cruz County—from Santa Cruz Public Library
 Santa Cruz County Conference & Visitors Council – Visitor Information
 List of movies shot in Santa Cruz County
 Santa Cruz Metropolitan Transit District
 QuickFacts from the US Census Bureau

 
California counties
1850 establishments in California
Populated places established in 1850